Khin Ma Ma Myo  is a Burmese politician who currently serves as Minister of Commerce of NUG. 

She was appointed by the Committee Representing Pyidaungsu Hluttaw as the Deputy Minister of Defence  in the National Unity Government of Myanmar on 16 April 2021 and later on transferred to the role of Minister of Commerce.

Early life and education 

Khin Ma Ma Myo was born in Taunggyi Township, Shan State on 1979. 

She has obtained B.A (Hons) International Studies, M.A (Economics), MSc in Strategic Studies and MRes Political Research from the University of Aberdeen in the United Kingdom.

References

Living people
People from Shan State
Year of birth missing (living people)
Burmese politicians